Beatriz Isabel Areizaga (born January 4, 1985), aka Beatriz Rosselló, is the former First Lady of Puerto Rico and wife of Ricardo Rosselló, the former Governor of Puerto Rico, who resigned office due to the Telegramgate scandal. She served as First Lady of Puerto Rico from January 2017 to August 2019.

Personal life
Rosselló was born Beatriz Isabel Areizaga García in San Juan, Puerto Rico on January 4, 1985. She married Ricardo Rosselló on October 14, 2012, in a ceremony in New Orleans, Louisiana. The couple have two children: Claudia Beatriz and Pedro Javier.

Early life and education
Rosselló studied at the Julián Blanco School, which specializes in ballet. She attended college at the Interamerican University of Puerto Rico.

She completed her bachelor's degree in psychology at the Interamerican University of Puerto Rico, where she graduated magna cum laude. Rosselló also pursued post-graduate studies at the Sanford School of Public Policy at Duke University in North Carolina, where she was the only Puerto Rican woman selected among a group of 56 students.

Early career
Rosselló was the chapter president of the Puerto Rico Statehood Students Association at the Inter-American University of Puerto Rico and vice president of the New Progressive Party of Puerto Rico's youth group in San Juan.

Tenure as first lady
Rosselló has been involved in initiatives such as “Fortaleza Para Ti”, Back To School, Women's Council, and Spayathon for Puerto Rico.  As a First Lady she ordered the commissioning of a monument to diversity called "Portico de la Igualdad" in June 2019, which was subsequently painted white during the Telegramgate protests.

Unidos por Puerto Rico Controversy

In July 2019, among calls for her husband to resign due to a scandal stemming from his involvement in an incriminating group chat with other government officials, Beatriz Rosselló was criticized for her management of Unidos for Puerto Rico, an agency established after Hurricane María which is currently under investigation by the FBI. Rosselló has been pointed out as having delayed the distribution disaster relief supplies. In August 2018, at least 10 trailers which held these supplies were found abandoned in a lot near a state election office; according to The New York Times, they had "broke[n] open and became infested by rats". A spokeswoman for the elections commission said the offices were being used as a storage point at the request of the First Lady. Raúl Maldonado Nieves, the son of former CFO and Treasury Secretary Raúl Maldonado Gautier,  claimed to have been present in a meeting in which Ricardo Rosselló demanded an amendment to an audit report into the containers as, according to Maldonado Nieves, the report would have “affected” the First Lady.

The FBI is also investigating the organization's finances and donations. The organization received $41 million in donations,  and it was run for a time by Jorge del Pino, the brother-in-law of lobbyist and group chat member Elías Sánchez.

References

Living people
1985 births
First Ladies and Gentlemen of Puerto Rico
Interamerican University of Puerto Rico alumni
People from San Juan, Puerto Rico
Puerto Rican female models
Puerto Rican people of Basque descent
Puerto Rico Statehood Students Association alumni
Rosselló family